The 1951–52 FAW Welsh Cup is the 65th season of the annual knockout tournament for competitive football teams in Wales.

Key
League name pointed after clubs name.
CCL - Cheshire County League
FL D3N - Football League Third Division North
SFL - Southern Football League

Fifth round
Ten winners from the Fourth round and six new clubs.

Sixth round

Semifinal
Cardiff City and Wrexham played at Shrewsbury, both matches between.

Final
Final were held at Cardiff.

External links
The FAW Welsh Cup

1951-52
Wales
Cup